Mi hermano es un clon (English title: My Brother is a Clone) is an Argentine telenovela produced by Pol-ka and broadcast by El Trece from September 3, 2018 to January 11, 2019.

Cast

Main 
 Nicolás Cabré as Renzo Figueroa / Mateo Mónaco
 Gimena Accardi as Lara Alcorta / Patricia López
 Flor Vigna as Ámbar Martini
 Luis Machín as Juan Cruz Santillán
 Andrea Bonelli as Marcela Figueroa
 Fabián Vena as Gabriel Méndez

Supporting 
 Tomás Fonzi as Camilo Figueroa
 Benjamín Rojas as Nacho Carmona
 Marcelo De Bellis as Facundo Mendoza
 Julieta Nair Calvo as Renata Fuentes
 Facundo Espinosa as Martín Gómez
 Benjamín Amadeo as Tomás Álzaga
 Pilar Gamboa as Natalia
 Bárbara Lombardo as Juana Méndez
 Miriam Odorico as Amelia Duarte
 Darío Lopilato as Fausto
 Benjamín Alfonso as Antonio Hauser
 Maida Andrenacci as Silvina Mancusi
 Fernanda Metilli as Rochi Álvarez
 María Onetto as Elena Mónaco
 Christian Sancho as Fabricio Del Monte

References

External links 
  

2018 telenovelas
Argentine telenovelas
Pol-ka telenovelas
2018 Argentine television series debuts
2019 Argentine television series endings
Spanish-language telenovelas
Comedy telenovelas